Pseudocoremia berylia is a species of moth in the family Geometridae. It is endemic to New Zealand. This species was first described by George Howes in 1943.

References 

Boarmiini
Moths of New Zealand
Endemic fauna of New Zealand
Moths described in 1953
Taxa named by George Howes (entomologist)
Endemic moths of New Zealand